The 1978 Navy Midshipmen football team represented the United States Naval Academy (USNA) as an independent during the 1978 NCAA Division I-A football season. The team was led by sixth-year head coach George Welsh.

Schedule

Personnel

Season summary

at Virginia

at Connecticut

at Boston College

at Air Force

Attendance: 30,482

Navy scored on six of its first seven possessions, gained over 400 yards of total offense and held Air Force to 75 yards through three quarters
Navy's best start since 1960

NAVY: Tata 47 FG
NAVY: McConkey 19 run (Tata kick)
NAVY: Tata 39 FG
NAVY: McConkey 36 pass from Leszczynski (Tata kick)
NAVY: Tata 43 FG
NAVY: Gainer 17 run (Tata kick)
AFA: Fortson 11 run (pass good)
NAVY: Callahan 39 run (Tata kick)

Duke

William & Mary

Pittsburgh

vs Notre Dame

at Syracuse

at Florida State

Navy accepted bid to Holiday Bowl

vs Army

Holiday Bowl (vs BYU)

References

Navy
Navy Midshipmen football seasons
Holiday Bowl champion seasons
Navy Midshipmen football